Ralph Wild Larkin (born May 27, 1940) is an American sociologist and research consultant. He is the author of Suburban Youth in Cultural Crisis (1979), Beyond Revolution: A New Theory of Social Movements (1986), and Comprehending Columbine (2007). He obtained his bachelor's degree from the University of California, Santa Barbara and received a master's degree in education from California State University at Northridge.

In 1969 he received a Ph.D. in Sociology of Education from the University of California, Los Angeles, and he taught sociology at Rutgers University, Newark in 1973. He met fellow sociologist Daniel A. Foss while teaching at Rutgers, and they later partnered in researching social movements. They co-authored a book together on social movements, and have jointly published studies in academic journals including Theory & Society, Sociological Analysis, and Social Text.  Larkin is a senior research associate and adjunct professor at the John Jay College of Criminal Justice, City University of New York, and owns his own consulting firm called Academic Research Consulting Service.

Early life and education
Larkin was born in Los Angeles, California on May 27, 1940, and obtained his bachelor's degree from the University of California, Santa Barbara in 1961. After teaching elementary school in California, Larkin obtained a master's degree in education from California State University at Northridge in 1966, and received his Ph.D. in Sociology of Education from the University of California, Los Angeles, in 1969. In 1970, Larkin moved to New York and worked as a research associate at the Center for Urban Education. He became an Assistant Professor of Sociology at Rutgers University in 1973.

Career

Research on social movements
Larkin met fellow sociologist Daniel A. Foss when they were both teaching Sociology at Rutgers University.  They have frequently partnered in research on the study of social movements. The book Beyond Revolution: A New Theory of Social Movements was co-authored with Foss.  Larkin and Foss have also jointly published research in sociology journals, including a piece on the white middle class youth movement of the 1960s and its relationship to later movements such as the Children of God, the Divine Light Mission, Swami Muktananda and the Revolutionary Youth Movement in Theory and Society.  They later wrote a more focused article dealing with Guru Maharaj Ji and his followers, which was published in Sociological Analysis, and a piece dealing with the vocabulary utilized in these social movements, in Social Text.  Larkin and Foss' research has later been cited by books on both the 1960s subculture, and on movements of social change such as the middle class youth movement and other forms of counterculture and subculture.

Teaching
Larkin has taught coursework in the Department of Sociology at the Newark College of Arts and Science of Rutgers University, and was also a research associate at the Center for the Study of Evaluation, University of California, Los Angeles Graduate School of Education.  After the publication of his work Comprehending Columbine (which discussed possible cultural and societal causes for the Columbine High School massacre), Larkin was contacted by the press for comment on the massacre, and discussed a judge's decision to seal information and tapes containing information about the killers. "The judge said the tapes were incendiary. We have plenty of things already that stimulate violence,"      said Larkin. Prior to writing the book, Larkin had given a seminar at the John Jay College of Criminal Justice's Center on Terrorism, entitled: "From Oklahoma City to Columbine: Paramilitary Influences on Eric Harris and Dylan Klebold."  Larkin is an adjunct professor at the John Jay College of Criminal Justice, City University of New York. He ran his own consulting firm called Academic Research Consulting Service for 25 years.

Published works

Books

Articles

See also

List of sociologists

References

External links
Academic Research Consulting Service, Ralph W. Larkin's consulting company
Ralph W. Larkin: Comprehending Columbine, official publisher's Web site for Larkin's 2007 book

Living people
California State University, Northridge alumni
American sociologists
1940 births
University of California, Santa Barbara alumni
University of California, Los Angeles alumni
John Jay College of Criminal Justice faculty
Rutgers University faculty
People from Los Angeles